Cyanophosphaethyne is an unstable molecular compound with structural formula N≡C–C≡P. It can be considered as cyanogen with one nitrogen atom replaced by phosphorus. It has been made as a dilute gas. Cyanophosphaethyne has been tentatively detected in the interstellar medium. Other structural isomers, such as C≡N–C≡P (isocyanophosphapropyne), C≡C-N≡P (azaphosphadicarbon), and N≡C–P=C (isocyanophosphavinylidene), have not been observed. The molecule has linear molecular geometry (C∞v molecular symmetry).

Production
Cyanophosphaethyne can be produced by heating cyanogen azide and phosphaethyne gases to 700 °C:
N≡C–N3 + H–C≡P → N≡C–C≡P + HN3

Another method is to heat anhydrous methyl cyanide with anhydrous phosphorus trichloride:
N≡C–CH3 + PCl3 → N≡C–C≡P + 3HCl

Properties
The dipole moment is 3.5 Debye. Having a large dipole makes the molecule easier to detect by certain types of spectroscopy than many other phosphorus containing molecules. The bond lengths are C≡N = 1.159 Å, C–C = 1.378 Å, and C≡P = 1.544 Å.

References

Organophosphanes
Nitriles